The men's 800 metres event at the 1952 Olympics took place between July 20 and July 22. Fifty athletes from 32 nations competed. The maximum number of athletes per nation had been set at 3 since the 1930 Olympic Congress. The final was won by the American Mal Whitfield.

Whitfield's win was his second (making him the second man to repeat in the 800 metres), as well as the third consecutive (in a streak that would reach four) and sixth overall victory for the United States. Only 0.2 seconds after Whitfield, Arthur Wint became the fifth man to earn a second medal of any color in the 800 metres, repeating his 1948 silver. Heinz Ulzheimer was the third German man to win an 800 metres medal, with the nation taking bronze in 1908 and 1928 as well as Ulzheimer's in 1952.

Summary

Starting from a waterfall start, most competitors were allowed to and chose to use a crouch start. Returning silver medalist Arthur Wint sprinted to the lead with Heinz Ulzheimer moving into a tight marking position with Gunnar Nielsen and Günther Steines sprinting to keep up. On the home stretch for the first time, defending champion Mal Whitfield moved forward, past the other chasers into a marking position on Ulzheimer. Wint continued to lead down the backstretch, then Whitfield accelerated past Ulzheimer, who turned to look, then at the beginning of the turn, Wint. It was a deja vu for Wint, seeing Whitfield ahead of him on the final turn of the Olympics. The first five were separated from the rest of the pack, Whitfield pulling away to defend his championship. Wint couldn't make any progress on Whitfield but held off the battle behind him. Steines lost ground, getting passed by a big rush by Albert Webster, but Nielsen pressed Ulzheimer to the line, Ulzheimer taking bronze with a lean then in the next step doing a face plant to the track.

Whitfield equalled the Olympic record he had set in London four years earlier, meaning he ran exactly the same time 1:49.2 in both races. Wint was a tenth of a second faster. Whitfield became the second man after Douglas Lowe to defend the 800 metres title. Peter Snell and David Rudisha have since equalled the feat.

Background

This was the 12th appearance of the event, which is one of 12 athletics events to have been held at every Summer Olympics. Only two of the finalists from the 1948 Games returned, but they were the top two: gold medalist Mal Whitfield of the United States and silver medalist Arthur Wint of Jamaica.

Cuba, Ghana, Guatemala, Israel, Pakistan, Puerto Rico, the Soviet Union, Thailand, and Venezuela appeared in the event for the first time. Great Britain and the United States each made their 11th appearance, tied for the most among all nations.

Competition format

The event used the three-round format introduced in 1912. There were eight first-round heats, each with between 5 and 7 athletes; the top three runners in each heat advanced to the semifinals. There were three semifinals with 8 athletes each; the top three runners in each semifinal advanced to the nine-man final.

Records

These were the standing world and Olympic records (in minutes) prior to the 1948 Summer Olympics.

Mal Whitfield repeated his own Olympic record with a time of 1:49.2 in the final.

Schedule

All times are Eastern European Summer Time (UTC+3)

Results

Round 1

The first round was held on July 20. The first three runners from each heat advanced to the semifinals.

Heat 1

Heat 2

Heat 3

Heat 4

Heat 5

Heat 6

Heat 7

Heat 8

Semifinals

The fastest three runners in each of the three heats advanced to the final round.

Semifinal 1

Semifinal 2

Semifinal 3

Final

References

Athletics at the 1952 Summer Olympics
800 metres at the Olympics
Men's events at the 1952 Summer Olympics